Wide Country was an American Western television series that aired on NBC from September 20, 1962 to April 25, 1963.

Synopsis
The series stars Earl Holliman and Andrew Prine as brothers, Mitch and Andy Guthrie, respectively, who are traveling rodeo competitors. In the recurring story line, older, wiser brother Mitch, a champion bronco rider, discourages Andy from following in Mitch's footsteps.

The pilot for the series entitled "Second Chance" was aired on March 13, 1962, on the anthology series Alcoa Premiere on ABC. Wide Country is similar to the ABC series Stoney Burke, starring Jack Lord as a rodeo performer, which aired thirty-two episodes during the same season.

Wide Country faced tough competition from ABC's The Adventures of Ozzie and Harriet and The Donna Reed Show and CBS's Mr. Ed and the first half of the legal drama, Perry Mason. The series was cancelled after one season.

Episode list

Guest stars

 Claude Akins
 Eddie Albert
 Frank Aletter
 Michael Ansara
 Rayford Barnes
 Noah Beery Jr.
 Nesdon Booth
 Edgar Buchanan
 Walter Burke
 James Caan
 Conlan Carter
 Jack Cassidy
 Lonny Chapman
 Yvonne Craig
 John Dehner
 Patty Duke
 Steve Forrest
 Eduard Franz
 Anthony George
 Alan Hale, Jr.
 Anne Helm
 Clyde Howdy
 Rodolfo Hoyos Jr.
 Jean Inness
 I. Stanford Jolley
 Diane Ladd
 Nolan Leary
 Norman Leavitt
 Karl Lukas
 Dayton Lummis
 Ralph Manza
 Peggy McCay
 Jim McMullan
 Roger Mobley
 Read Morgan
 Jay Novello
 Barbara Parkins 
 Slim Pickens
 Ford Rainey
 Anthony Ray
 Chris Robinson
 Barbara Stuart
 Olive Sturgess
 Lyle Talbot 
 Ray Teal
 Forrest Tucker
 Lurene Tuttle
 Ray Walston
 Bruce Yarnell

Home media
On November 15, 2011, Timeless Media Group released Wide Country- The Complete Television Series on DVD in Region 1.  The 8-disc set features all 28 episodes of the series.

References

External links 
 
 

1962 American television series debuts
1963 American television series endings
1960s American drama television series
Black-and-white American television shows
English-language television shows
NBC original programming
1960s Western (genre) television series
Television series about brothers